The men's 10,000 metres in speed skating at the 1992 Winter Olympics took place on 20 February, at the L'anneau de vitesse. 30 competitors from 14 nations participated in the event.

Records
Prior to this competition, the existing world and Olympic records were as follows:

Results

References

Men's speed skating at the 1992 Winter Olympics